CBS Albany may refer to:

WRGB, in Albany, New York
WSWG (TV), in Albany, Georgia